Snohomish can refer to:

 Snohomish people, a tribe of the Lushootseed people native to Puget Sound in Washington State
 Snohomish dialect, the dialect of Lushootseed spoken by the tribe
 Snohomish, Washington, a city located in the county of the same name
 Snohomish County, Washington
 Snohomish River in Washington
 Snohomish High School in Washington
 , formerly known as MV Snohomish, a ferry in the San Francisco Bay Area
 USCGC Snohomish (CG-16), (1908–1934) originally a United States Revenue Cutter
 USCGC Snohomish (WYTM-98), a former US Coast Guard icebreaking tug

Language and nationality disambiguation pages